Alessandro Ruotolo (born 9 July 1955) is an Italian journalist and politician. He was elected to the Italian Senate in a by-election in 2020 as an Independent politician of the centre-left coalition.

Political career 
In November 2019, Five Star Movement Senator Franco Ortolani died from cancer. A by-election was held in the Naples district in February 2020, in which Ruotolo stood as an independent candidate with support from the centre-left coalition. Ruotolo was elected with 48% of the votes.

Ruotolo has written about the COVID-19 pandemic in Italy.

References

External links 
 Twitter
 Facebook

1955 births
Living people
Members of the Italian Senate from Campania
Politicians from Naples
Independent politicians in Italy
21st-century Italian journalists
Senators of Legislature XVIII of Italy
20th-century Italian people